Bomford is a surname. Notable people with the surname include:
Andrew Bomford (born 1974), Australian rules footballer 
Anthony G. Bomford, British engineer and surveyor, after whom Bomford Peak in Antarctica is named
Benjamin Bomford, 19th-century English farmer
George Bomford (1780–1848), military officer in the United States Army 
Gerald Bomford (1851–1915), British surgeon 
Guy Bomford (1899–1966), British geodesist
James Vote Bomford (1811–1892), soldier in the United States military, son of George
Laurence George Bomford (1847–1926), English painter and clergyman

See also 
 Bamford (surname)

English-language surnames